The Linux Beer Hike (a.k.a. "LBW")  is a week-long event which takes place in a different European country each summer, drawing together open-source software enthusiasts from more than a dozen different countries, for a combination of talks, presentations, hands-on mini-projects, outdoor exercise, and good food and drink.

The name Linux Bier Wanderung comes from the fact that the first event was held in Pottenstein in Germany (in 1999) in the form of a traditional German "Bierwanderung" for Linux enthusiasts. Since then the event has been held at the following locations:
 1999: Pottenstein, Germany
 2000: Coniston, England
 2001: Bouillon, Belgium
 2002: Doolin, Ireland
 2003: Tajov, Slovakia
 2004: Schin op Geul, Netherlands
 2005: Killin, Scotland
 2006: Palūšė, Lithuania
 2007: Hersonissos, Greece. LBW was organised by Hellenic Linux User Group, and was held on 2–9 September 2007.
 2008: Samnaun, Switzerland (9–17 August)
 2009: Helmbrechts, Germany
 2010: Alfriston, Sussex, England
 2011: Tux-Lanersbach, Austria
 2012: Diksmuide, Belgium
 2013: Castleton, England
 2014: Talybont-on-Usk, Wales
 2015: Wiltz, Luxembourg
 2016: Laxey, Isle of Man
 2017: St. Martin in Passeier, Italy
 2018: Jedovnice, Czech Republic
 2019: Craven Arms, England (12–18 August 2019)
 2020: Kronberg, Germany (30 August – 5 September 2020) Unfortunately owed to current circumstances this event has been cancelled.

References

External links
 

Free-software events
Recurring events established in 1999
1999 establishments in Germany